The Christie Cup is an annual varsity match between the Universities of Leeds, Liverpool and Manchester in numerous sports and has been held since 1886. After the well-known rivalry between Oxford and Cambridge, the Christie's Championships is the oldest inter–university competition on the English sporting calendar.
 
The annual event is named after the benefactor Richard Copley Christie, who was a professor of History and Political Economy in Manchester from 1854 to 1866. After his death in 1901, his widow Mary Helen Christie donated the Christie Cup and Shield which is still played for today. The three constituent colleges of the former Victoria University are facing each other annually in 32 different sports. The contested competitions range from traditional British sports like football, hockey, rugby league, rugby union, tennis, and water polo to modern competitions like climbing or ultimate. 
 
Students compete in 32 different sports, all rolled into one afternoon of competition. As a triangular competition, Christie Championship is recognised nationally as one of the largest sporting varsities with more than 1,500 students taking part. The competitions are held each year in April or May on two Wednesday afternoons to be hosted by one of the three universities each. Manchester had won for five consecutive years until 2011 where the University of Leeds won the competition on home soil.

In 2018 the University of Liverpool won the title for the first time since 1991.

References

External links
 Official event website

University of Manchester
University of Leeds
University of Liverpool
Student sport rivalries in the United Kingdom